Tania Major (born 13 June 1981) is an Aboriginal activist who first came to prominence in 2004 as the youngest person elected to the Aboriginal and Torres Strait Islander Commission (ATSIC).

Biography
Born in Cairns, Queensland, to Peter Taylor and Priscilla Major, Major was educated at Clayfield College and Griffith University in Brisbane, where she graduated with a Bachelor of Arts in criminology and criminal justice.

The Cairns-based indigenous youth advocate used her profile to draw attention to domestic violence in the Aboriginal community. Her forthright way of addressing the problems focused national attention on the issue. She spoke to opinion makers, the public and government about sexual violence and rape in the Aboriginal community, asking Prime Minister John Howard to help lift the "blanket of shame" that was preventing such assaults being reported. "I'm proud to be an Aboriginal Australian and to have been recognised and acknowledged for the work I'm involved in," Major said.

In 2007, Major was named as the Young Australian of the Year, having been earlier named as the Queensland Young Australian of the Year. She is currently the Youth Development Project Officer for the Cape York Institute for Policy and Leadership, and a Regional Councillor for the Aboriginal and Torres Strait Islander Commission (ATSIC).

References

External links
 Transcript, "Cry from the Heart, 60 Minutes, 30 July 2006.
 Four Corners Interview with Tania Major
 Youtube video 2007

1981 births
Living people
People from Cairns
People educated at Clayfield College
Griffith University alumni
Australian indigenous rights activists
Women human rights activists